Move α is a feature of the Revised Extended Standard Theory (REST) of transformational grammar developed by Noam Chomsky in the late 1970s.  The term refers to the relation between an indexed constituent and its trace t, e.g., the relation of whom and [t] in the example
Whom1 do you think you are kidding t1 ?
In the 1990s Minimalist Program, it became a structure-building operation together with "Merge".
"α" is the placeholder symbol for the moved constituent.
The constituent (whom) and its trace (t) are said to form a "chain".

A term used in government-binding theory to refer to a single, universal movement rule, which subsumes all specific movement rules; also called alpha movement. The rule permits the movement of any phrasal or lexical category from one part of a sentence to another in such a way that the operation involves substitution or (Chomsky-) adjunction. The application of the transformation is restricted by the subjacency principle of bounding (sub-)theory, and its output is subject to a variety of filters, principles, etc. stated by other (sub-)theories of GB. See also affect alpha.

In syntax, the most general formulation of possible movement permitted by a rule. More specific rules include move NP and move wh, which in turn are more general than specific transformations such as those involved in passivization.

The single transformational rule occurring in most versions of GB. Usually expressed as 'Move-alpha', it can be stated more fully as 'Move any category to a different position'. The massive overgeneration which this rule would produce in isolation is heavily constrained by the other components of the grammar. Chomsky (1980).

"Move α" in practice means "Move any constituent anywhere".
"Affect Alpha" is a generalization to the effect of "Do anything to anything". The latter is viewed with suspicion by proponents of REST as an overgeneralization.

"Move α" marks a shift of attention in transformational grammar in around 1980, away from focussing on specific rules (the only "rule" is "Move α") to "Principles" constraining them.

See also
Movement paradox
Syntactic movement
Wh-movement

References

Generative syntax
Noam Chomsky
Syntactic transformation